
Brzeziny County is a unit of territorial administration and local government (powiat) in Łódź Voivodeship, central Poland. It was created in 2002 out of the north-eastern part of Łódź East County.

As of 2006 its total population is 30,600, out of which the population of Brzeziny is 12,373 and the rural population is 18,227.

Neighbouring counties
Brzeziny County is bordered by Łowicz County to the north, Skierniewice County to the east, Tomaszów Mazowiecki County to the south-east, Łódź East County to the south and west, and Zgierz County to the north-west.

Administrative division
The county is subdivided into five gminas (one urban and four rural). These are listed in the following table, in descending order of population.

References
Polish official population figures 2006

 
Brzeziny